Plain Brown Wrapper is the fifth studio album by American country music artist Gary Morris. It was released on August 18, 1986, via Warner Bros. The album includes the singles "Honeycomb', "Leave Me Lonely" and "Plain Brown Wrapper", the album's title track.

Track listing

Personnel
Adapted from liner notes.

Jamie Brantley - guitar, background vocals
Steve Brantley - bass guitar, background vocals
Mike Brigham - drums
Mark Casstevens - guitar, banjo, mandolin
Jerry Douglas - dobro, lap steel guitar
Gary Hooker - guitar, background vocals
Edgar Meyer - string bass
Gary Morris - lead vocals, background vocals
Mark O'Connor - violin, mandolin
Howard Simpers - falling star
Paul Worley - guitar

Chart performance

References

1986 albums
Gary Morris albums
Warner Records albums